The following is a list of Denver Pioneers men's basketball head coaches. There have been 32 head coaches of the Pioneers in their 119-season history.

Denver's current head coach is Jeff Wulbrun. He was hired as the Pioneers' head coach in March 2021, replacing Rodney Billups, who was fired after the 2021–22 season.

References

Denver

Denver Pioneers men's basketball coaches